The Chiefs of Joint Staff of the Armed Forces of Bosnia and Herzegovina are a group of Chiefs that have command over the Armed Forces of Bosnia and Herzegovina.

Role and responsibility
After the January 2006 abolition of the Army of the Federation of Bosnia and Herzegovina and the Army of Republika Srpska and the creation of the Armed Forces of Bosnia and Herzegovina, the Chiefs of Joint Staff of the Armed Forces of Bosnia and Herzegovina was created.

Their role and responsibility right now is to implement processes of reform and transformation of the Armed Forces of Bosnia and Herzegovina. Activity is in process and it asks new structures, new rules, new way of thinking and adaption.

List of chiefs of joint staff

For period from 1918 to 2006, see Chief of the General Staff of Yugoslavia.

See also
 Armed Forces of Bosnia and Herzegovina

References

Military of Bosnia and Herzegovina
Bosnia and Herzegovina